The 2007–08 Swedish Figure Skating Championships were held at the Scandinavium in Göteborg between December 7 and 10, 2007. Because they were held in December, they were officially designated by the Swedish federation as the 2007 Swedish Championships, but the champions are the 2008 Swedish Champions. Senior level (Olympic-level), junior level, and two age-group levels of novice (Riksmästerskap (RM) and UngdomsSM (USM)) skaters competed in the disciplines of men's singles, ladies' singles, and pair skating. This event was used to help choose the Swedish teams for the 2008 World Championships, the 2008 European Championships, and the 2008 World Junior Championships.

Senior results

Men

Ladies

Junior results

Men

Ladies

Novice USM results

Boys

Girls

Novice RM results

Boys

Girls

Pairs

External links
 2007–08 Swedish Championships results

2007 in figure skating
2008 in figure skating
Swedish Figure Skating Championships
Figure Skating Championships
Figure Skating Championships
Sports competitions in Gothenburg
2000s in Gothenburg